The Bloss Mansion is a historic house located at 1020 Cedar Ave. in Atwater, California. The house was built in 1914 by George Bloss, the first mayor of Atwater and a prominent donor to the city. The house's design reflects several popular architectural styles of its era. The Mission Revival Style had the greatest influence on the structure, as exhibited in its stucco construction and tile roof. Prairie School elements of the house include its three-part windows, broad eaves, and overall emphasis, while the house's front entrance and side porch have a Classical design with Tuscan columns.

Bloss donated the house to the city in 1963; it now houses the Atwater Historical Society and the Atwater Chamber of Commerce.

The Bloss Mansion was added to the National Register of Historic Places on September 3, 1981.

References

External links

 Atwater Historical Society - Bloss House Museum

Houses on the National Register of Historic Places in California
Mission Revival architecture in California
Prairie School architecture in California
Neoclassical architecture in California
Houses completed in 1914
Houses in Merced County, California
Museums in Merced County, California
Historic house museums in California
National Register of Historic Places in Merced County, California